David Smith (born May 15, 1985) is an American professional volleyball player. He is a member of the US national team, a bronze medalist at the Olympic Games Rio 2016 and the 2018 World Championship, 2015 World Cup winner, and a two–time Champions League winner (2021, 2022). At the professional club level, he plays for ZAKSA Kędzierzyn-Koźle.

Personal life
Smith was born in the Los Angeles district of Panorama City on May 15, 1985. Born nearly deaf, he wears hearing aids and reads lips to understand his teammates. He grew up in Santa Clarita, where he attended Saugus High School.

Smith is 6 feet, 8 inches tall. He married his wife Kelli in 2008, and has one son who was born in 2012. He also has a daughter.

Career

College
Smith played for the UC Irvine volleyball team from 2004 to 2007. In 2004, his .369 hitting percentage was the highest on the team. He also had a 1.03 blocking average and 102 block assists. The following season, he had a .401 hitting percentage and a 0.86 blocking average. Smith then had a .412 hitting percentage, 1.27 blocking average, 129 block assists, and 143 total blocks in 2006.

In 2007, Smith helped University of California win the NCAA National Champions title. His .559 hitting percentage led the nation and was a new school record. He also broke the UCI single-season block assists record, with 160. Smith was named to the All-American first team and the NCAA All-Tournament team. He finished his UCI career as the school's all-time leader in block assists (471) and total blocks (520).

National team
Smith joined the U.S. national team in 2009. That year, he was named the Best Blocker at the World Championship Qualifier and played in the FIVB World League. In 2010, he helped the U.S. win the Pan American Cup.

Smith tied as the team's second-leading scorer at the 2011 Pan American Cup, as the U.S. finished second. He then played in the 2012 FIVB World League, where the U.S. finished second. At the 2012 Summer Olympics, he was a substitute and had eight points.

Honours

Clubs
 CEV Champions League
  2020/2021 – with ZAKSA Kędzierzyn-Koźle
  2021/2022 – with ZAKSA Kędzierzyn-Koźle

 National championships
 2010/2011  Spanish SuperCup, with CV Almería
 2010/2011  Spanish Championship, with CV Almería
 2011/2012  French SuperCup, with Tours VB
 2011/2012  French Championship, with Tours VB
 2012/2013  French Cup, with Tours VB
 2012/2013  French Championship, with Tours VB
 2013/2014  French SuperCup, with Tours VB
 2013/2014  French Cup, with Tours VB
 2013/2014  French Championship, with Tours VB
 2014/2015  French SuperCup, with Tours VB
 2014/2015  French Cup, with Tours VB
 2014/2015  French Championship, with Tours VB
 2019/2020  Polish SuperCup, with ZAKSA Kędzierzyn-Koźle
 2020/2021  Polish SuperCup, with ZAKSA Kędzierzyn-Koźle
 2020/2021  Polish Cup, with ZAKSA Kędzierzyn-Koźle
 2021/2022  Polish Cup, with ZAKSA Kędzierzyn-Koźle
 2021/2022  Polish Championship, with ZAKSA Kędzierzyn-Koźle
 2022/2023  Polish Cup, with ZAKSA Kędzierzyn-Koźle

Youth national team
 2004  NORCECA U21 Championship

Individual awards
 2012: French Championship – Best Middle Blocker
 2015: French Championship – Best Middle Blocker
 2016: French Championship – Best Middle Blocker
 2022: FIVB Nations League – Best Middle Blocker

References

External links
 Player profile at TeamUSA.org
 
 Player profile at PlusLiga.pl 
 
 Player profile at Volleybox.net

1985 births
Living people
People from Panorama City, Los Angeles
People from Saugus, Santa Clarita, California
Volleyball players from Los Angeles
Sportspeople from Santa Clarita, California
American men's volleyball players
Olympic volleyball players of the United States
Deaf volleyball players
Volleyball players at the 2012 Summer Olympics
Volleyball players at the 2016 Summer Olympics
Volleyball players at the 2020 Summer Olympics
Medalists at the 2016 Summer Olympics
Olympic bronze medalists for the United States in volleyball
American expatriate sportspeople in Northern Ireland
American expatriate sportspeople in Germany
Expatriate volleyball players in Germany
American expatriate sportspeople in Spain
Expatriate volleyball players in Spain
American expatriate sportspeople in France
Expatriate volleyball players in France
American expatriate sportspeople in Poland
Expatriate volleyball players in Poland
UC Irvine Anteaters men's volleyball players
Tours Volley-Ball players
Czarni Radom players
Warta Zawiercie players
Resovia (volleyball) players
ZAKSA Kędzierzyn-Koźle players
Middle blockers